Thomas Edwards or Tom Edwards may refer to:

Arts and entertainment
 Thomas Edwards (poet) (died 1595), author of Cephalus and Procris; Narcissus
 Thomas Edwards (critic) (1699–1757), English critic and poet
 Twm o'r Nant (1739–1810), pen name of Welsh playwright Thomas Edwards
 Thomas Edwards (legal writer) (1775–1845), legal writer
 Thomas Edwards (author) (1779–1858), Welsh author
 Thomas Edwards (artist) (1795–1869), portraitist in Boston, Massachusetts
 Tommy Edwards (Thomas J. Edwards, 1922–1969), American singer and songwriter
 Tom Edwards (broadcaster) (born 1945), British radio presenter and television announcer
 Tom Edwards (musician), British musician
 Tom Edwards (actor), Canadian voice actor

Politics
 Thomas Edwards (MP for Lichfield), in 1554 and 1555, Member of Parliament (MP) for Lichfield
 Thomas Edwards (MP for Calne) (1555–1634), MP for Calne
 Thomas Edwards (MP) (c. 1673–c. 1745), English Member of Parliament for Wells, 1719–1735
 Thomas Edwards-Freeman (1720s–1808), MP for Steyning
 Thomas Edwards (TJAG) (1753–1806), Judge Advocate General of the United States Army
 Thomas M. Edwards (1795–1875), U.S. Representative from New Hampshire
 Thomas O. Edwards (1810–1876), U.S. Representative from Ohio
 Thomas D. Edwards (1849–?), American diplomat
 Thomas Edwards (Australian politician) (1875–1951), represented Barossa from 1930 to 1933
 Chet Edwards (Thomas Chester Edwards, born 1951), U.S. Representative from Texas

Religion
 Thomas Edwards (heresiographer) (1599–1647), English Puritan clergyman and author of Gangraena
 Thomas Edwards (orientalist) (1652–1721), Welsh divine and orientalist
 Thomas Edwards (divine) (1729–1785), Anglican clergyman and divine
 Thomas Edwards (fl. 1810), divine
 Thomas Charles Edwards (1837–1900), Welsh minister, writer and academic
 Thomas Edwards (priest) (born 1933), Anglican priest in Wales

Sports
 Tom Edwards (American football) (1899–1980), All-American football player
 Tom Edwards (footballer, born 1906) (1906–1980), Linfield and Wales international footballer
 Tom Edwards (footballer, born 1999), Stoke City footballer
 Tommy Edwards (basketball) (1911–1977), American professional basketball player
 Tommy Edwards (footballer) (1923–2000), Welsh footballer

Other
 Thomas Edwards (silversmith), in colonial Boston, Massachusetts
 Thomas E. Edwards or SS Edmund Fitzgerald, an American Great Lakes freighter that sank in a Lake Superior storm in 1975
 Thomas Edwards (VC) (1863–1953), English recipient of the Victoria Cross
 Tom Edwards (geographer) (born 1965), American geographer and geopolitical consultant

See also
Thomas Edwardes (disambiguation)
Thomas Edward (disambiguation)